Leopoldo B. Ang (born 19 December 1937) is a Filipino former sports shooter. He competed at the 1964 Summer Olympics and the 1968 Summer Olympics. He also competed at the 1966 Asian Games and won three medals in team events.

References

External links
 

1937 births
Living people
Filipino male sport shooters
Olympic shooters of the Philippines
Shooters at the 1964 Summer Olympics
Shooters at the 1968 Summer Olympics
Sportspeople from Manila
Asian Games medalists in shooting
Shooters at the 1966 Asian Games
Asian Games silver medalists for the Philippines
Asian Games bronze medalists for the Philippines
Medalists at the 1966 Asian Games
20th-century Filipino people